South Pacific is a compilation album of phonograph records by Bing Crosby, Danny Kaye, Ella Fitzgerald and Evelyn Knight  released in 1949 featuring songs from the Rodgers and Hammerstein musical, South Pacific. The album was placed 8th in Billboard's chart of best-selling popular record albums in July 1949.

Track listing
The songs were featured on a 4-disc, 78 rpm album set, Decca Album A-714.
All music by Richard Rodgers; all lyrics by Oscar Hammerstein II.

LP release
The songs from the album were subsequently released on a 10" vinyl long-playing record (DL 5207) in 1951 and the LP achieved 10th. position in the album charts.

References

Bing Crosby compilation albums
1949 compilation albums
Decca Records compilation albums